Lipit-Enlil, written dli-pí-it den.líl, where the Sumerian King List and the Ur-Isin king list  match on his name and reign, was the 8th king of the 1st dynasty of Isin and ruled for five years, ca. 1810 BC – 1806 BC (short chronology) or 1873–1869 BC (middle chronology). He was the son of Būr-Sîn.

Biography

There are no inscriptions known for this king. His brief reign ended a period of relative stability and he was succeeded by Erra-Imittī whose filiation is unknown, as the Sumerian King List omits this information from this point on. Both he and his successor were conspicuous in the absence of royal hymns or dedicatory prayers and Hallo speculates this may have been due to the distractions afforded by the commencement of conflict with Larsa.

The archives of the temple of Ninurta, the é-šu-me-ša4, in Nippur, extended over more than seventy-five years, from year 1 of Lipit-Enlil of Isin (1810) to year 28 of Rim-Sin I (1730) and were inadvertently preserved when they were used as infill for the temple of Inanna in the Parthian period. The 420 fragments show a thriving temple economy absorbing much of the available wealth. The year-names following his accession year all somewhat monotonously commemorate generous gifts to the temple of Enlil.

External links
Lipit-Enlil year-names at CDLI.

Inscriptions

References

19th-century BC Sumerian kings
Dynasty of Isin